is Hatsune Okumura's third single. It was released on June 23, 2008, by Avex Trax.

Overview
 comes exactly three months after the release of Okumura's first digital single in on April 23.  was used as the theme song to the television dorama .

Specifics
Artist: Okumura Hatsune
Title:  
Code: AVCD-31458/B CD+DVDAVCD-31459 CD only
Release Date: 2008.07.23 
Price: ￥1,890 CD+DVD ; ￥1,050 CD only

Track list

CD section
 
 
  (inst.)
  (inst.)

DVD section
  (music clip)

Charts

Oricon chart positions

2008 singles
Avex Trax singles
Japanese television drama theme songs
2008 songs